The PNW Wrestling Extravaganza were two professional wrestling supercards held by the NWA Pacific Northwest, also known as Portland Wrestling in the U.S. state of Oregon, at the Memorial Coliseum in Portland.

60th Anniversary Wrestling Extravaganza

The PNW 60th Anniversary Wrestling Extravaganza was the first of the two events. It took place on May 21, 1985 at the Portland's Memorial Coliseum.

Don Owen was the National Wrestling Alliance promoter for the Pacific Northwest territory, having in 1942 taken over the family business his father started in 1925.  In honor of the Owen family's 60 years of promoting wrestling in the Northwest, they promoted the 60th Anniversary Wrestling Extravaganza.

This event took place just less than 2 months after the first WWF WrestleMania.  While this card didn't draw the media attention that WrestleMania did, this event was notable in many ways.  The card was unique in that it featured active stars from each of the three major promotions in the United States at that time, AWA, NWA and WWF. In addition to having AWA World Heavyweight Champion Rick Martel, AWA World Tag Team Champions The Road Warriors and NWA World Heavyweight Champion Ric Flair on the card, it featured two wrestlers from the WWF who had just recently competed (against other competitors) in the WWF's first WrestleMania; they were the WWF's most prominent heel, Rowdy Roddy Piper (who established himself in PNW and was one of the territory's most popular stars while he competed there) and Playboy Buddy Rose (who wrestled in WrestleMania as the masked Executioner).
Piper was greeted with a standing ovation, as he entered the ring to wrestle  Portland's number one Heel, Playboy Buddy Rose.
Don Owen gave credit to Rose & Piper for drawing the Largest Gate ever in Northwest History.
Credit a strong supporting cast of legendary wrestlers as well.

Results

Superstar Extravaganza

The PNW Superstar Extravaganza was the second of the two events. It took place on January 21, 1986, also at the Memorial Coliseum.

Results

References

 Online World of Wrestling: Portland Results
 Portland Results - 1985 at Old School Wrestling (May 21)

1985 in professional wrestling
1986 in professional wrestling
Wrestling Extravaganza
Events in Portland, Oregon
1985 in Portland, Oregon
Professional wrestling in Oregon
1986 in Portland, Oregon